Andres Mauricio Caicedo Piedrahita (born ) is a Colombian male weightlifter, competing in the 77 kg category and representing Colombia at international competitions. He participated at the 2016 Summer Olympics in the men's 77 kg event, finishing 6th. He competed at world championships, including at the 2015 World Weightlifting Championships.

Prior to the 2018 World Weightlifting Championships, Caicedo was provisionally suspended for testing positive for the anabolic steroid, Boldenone. Fellow Colombian and Junior World Champion at 77 kg, Yeison Lopez Lopez, was also provisionally suspended for testing positive for the same substance. The International Weightlifting Federation later banned them both until 2022 for testing positive for Boldenone and its metabolites.

Major results

References

1997 births
Living people
Colombian male weightlifters
Place of birth missing (living people)
Weightlifters at the 2016 Summer Olympics
Olympic weightlifters of Colombia
Weightlifters at the 2014 Summer Youth Olympics
21st-century Colombian people